The Tyrrell Historical Library is a public library in Beaumont, Texas. Originally built in 1903 to serve as the First Baptist Church, the building displays a mix of Richardsonian Romanesque and Victorian Gothic architectures, with pointed arch windows and quatrefoils, and all of its original stained glass. The building became vacant in 1923 when the congregation moved to a new location. It was bought by Captain W. C. Tyrrell, who donated the building to the city for use as its first public library. The building is listed in the National Register of Historic Places and also as a Recorded Texas Historic Landmark. It is also a contributing property to the Downtown Historic District.

After renovations, the library opened in 1926, serving as the main public library until 1974. Following construction of a new facility, this one was renamed as the "Tyrrell Historical Library," in honor of the philanthropist. It is the center repository of extensive genealogical archives and the library maintains a hallmark Texana collection. It was remodeled with systems upgrades in 1990. An addition was constructed in 2010, reflecting the main building's style without trying to recreate it.

Photo gallery

See also

National Register of Historic Places listings in Jefferson County, Texas
Recorded Texas Historic Landmarks in Jefferson County

References

External links

Tyrell Historical Library, Beaumont Public Library System

Churches completed in 1903
Buildings and structures in Beaumont, Texas
Public libraries in Texas
Education in Beaumont, Texas
Historic district contributing properties in Texas
Tourist attractions in Beaumont, Texas
National Register of Historic Places in Jefferson County, Texas
Research libraries in the United States